is a Japanese word and may refer to:

"Jōnetsu" (Kinki Kids song), a 2001 single by Japanese singing duo Kinki Kids
"Jōnetsu" (Miliyah Kato song), a 2005 single by Japanese singer Miliyah Kato (and a cover of the Ua song)
"Jōnetsu" (Ua song), a 1996 single from Japanese singer Ua
"Jōnetsu" (Yuki Saito song), a 1985 single from Japanese singer Yuki Saito

See also
"Jōnetsu no Bara", a 1990 single from the Japanese rock band The Blue Hearts
"Jōnetsu no Daishō/Escape", a 2008 single by the Japanese band Girl Next Door
"Jōnetsu no Kaze", a 2007 single by the Jpop group The Inazuma Sentai